Richard Timothy Kring (born July 9, 1957) is an American screenwriter and television producer, best known for his creation of the drama series Strange World, Crossing Jordan, Heroes, and Touch.

Early life

Kring was born in El Dorado County, California. He is Jewish. He has two brothers and a sister.

He attended Allan Hancock College, where his father, Ray, was the track coach, then graduated from the University of Southern California School of Cinematic Arts in 1983. Discussing his beginnings, Kring said:

Career
Kring's first job as a screenwriter was for the television show Knight Rider. Other early  projects included co-writing an episode of Misfits of Science (which, like his later project Heroes, featured super-powered humans as a main theme) and Teen Wolf Too with Jeph Loeb. Kring and Loeb would collaborate again when producing Heroes. Kring also co-wrote the 2010 book Shift: A Novel (Gates of Orpheus Trilogy) with Dale Peck.

In 1999, it signed a deal with NBC.

After the cancellation of Heroes in 2010 Kring created the TV series Touch, a drama focusing on a father (Kiefer Sutherland) who discovers that his mute son can predict future events. The series premiered on January 25, 2012 on Fox and was cancelled after two seasons on May 9, 2013.

On February 22, 2014, during its Olympics coverage, NBC announced Heroes was coming back as a 13-episode event miniseries titled Heroes Reborn. It premiered in 2015 with creator Tim Kring as the executive producer.

Awards and nominations
Kring has been nominated for an Emmy Award in 2007 for Outstanding Drama Series as the producer for Heroes. He was also named one of the Masters of Sci Fi TV for his work on the series.

Filmography

Film

Television 
The numbers in writing credits refer to the number of episodes.

References

External links

 
 Interview: Tim Kring, Heroes creator, The TV Addict, 2006-10-12
 NBC's Super Heroes: Burning Questions Answered!, TV Guide, 2006-10-16 (archive.org link)

American male film actors
American male screenwriters
American soap opera writers
Television producers from California
Jewish American writers
People from El Dorado County, California
USC School of Cinematic Arts alumni
1957 births
Living people
Showrunners
American male television writers
Screenwriters from California
21st-century American Jews